Thomas "Tommy" Edward Seigler Jr. (born September 24, 1938) is a retired American professional wrestler.  Better known as Tommy Seigler, he is a former All-South Heavyweight Champion and NWA British Commonwealth Heavyweight Championship.

Early life 
Tommy was born to Thomas & Clare Seigler in Fieldale, Virginia.  Moving back to South Carolina after birth, Tommy was raised in Anderson.  Upon entering high school, his family moved to Iva, South Carolina, where Tommy attended Iva High School.  There he competed in football, basketball, and baseball, and was selected as an all-conference basketball player.  Upon graduating in 1956, Tommy moved to Flint, Michigan to work in a car factory, but returned to South Carolina a year later.  Tommy began working in the construction industry with his father, where he became a master pipefitter.

Wrestling career (1963-1978) 
In 1963, while on a construction job in Pensacola, Florida, he began working out at a local gym where he was noticed by some local wrestlers who convinced him to give wrestling a try.  Tommy began training and only wrestled part-time, while continuing to work in construction.  After six years of part-time wrestling Tommy decided to make it his full-time career.  In 1972, he won the NWA Macon Tag Team Championship with Argentina Apollo, where the two began a successful period as tag team wrestlers, before departing for All-South Wrestling.  In 1973, he won Georgia's Heavyweight Championship and the All-South Heavyweight Championship. He also won the Southeastern Heavyweight Champion title in 1975, and again in 1976.  In 1976, he also won the NWA Florida Television Championship. In 1977, he was named the WFIA International Wrestler of the Year, and defeated The Iron Sheik (Ali Vaziri) to win the NWA British Commonwealth Heavyweight Championship, which he held until his retirement in 1978.

Throughout his career, Tommy worked for the National Wrestling Alliance (NWA), Championship Wrestling from Florida(CWF), Mid-Atlantic Championship Wrestling, & All-South Wrestling Alliance.  He wrestled around the world in places such as Australia, New Zealand, England, South Africa, and Singapore.  Tommy's career was cut short in December, 1977, when he ruptured three discs in his lower back while wrestling the Iron Sheik in Singapore.   After having the discs fused together Tommy tried to rehabilitate and return to the ring, but was forced to retire from wrestling in 1978.

After wrestling 
Tommy continued to appear at wrestling matches from time to time in guest appearances, but never returned to the ring.  He returned home to Anderson, South Carolina where he was a member of the local law enforcement for two decades.   In December, 2019, he retired from his position as the head of security for the Historic Anderson County Courthouse.

Personal life 
Tommy has four children and seven grandchildren.  He continues to work out daily, having a personal gym of his own with over 4,000 pounds of weights.  He is an avid motorcycle rider.

References 

1938 births
American male professional wrestlers
Living people
20th-century professional wrestlers
NWA Florida Television Champions